The Annals of the American Association of Geographers is a bimonthly peer-reviewed academic journal covering geography. It was established in 1911  as the Annals of the Association of American Geographers.

The journal is published by Taylor and Francis on behalf of the American Association of Geographers. Its other official journals are The Professional Geographer, AAG Review of Books, GeoHumanities, and African Geographical Review. According to the Journal Citation Reports, the journal has a 2015 impact factor of 2.756, ranking it 8th out of 77 journals in the category "Geography".

References

External links 
 

Geography journals
Taylor & Francis academic journals
Publications established in 1911
Bimonthly journals
English-language journals
American Association of Geographers
1911 establishments in the United States
Academic journals associated with learned and professional societies of the United States